Parevia guianensis is a moth of the subfamily Arctiinae first described by James John Joicey and George Talbot in 1916. It is found in French Guiana.

References

Phaegopterina